Stanlake Park Wine Estate is the largest vineyard in the English county of Berkshire. It is situated near to Twyford, in the parishes of Hurst and Ruscombe.

Vineyard and winery
The winery also makes wine for many other English vineyards and during a high yield year, the estate processes between 150 and 200 tons of grapes. It was originally known as Thames Valley Vineyards and was first planted in 1979, by Jon. S.E Leighton, a later life Viticulturist, educated externally by Charles Sturt University, Wagga Wagga, NSW. Australia.

Country house

Stanlake Park has a 16th-century Elizabethan country house at the centre of the estate. It is the manor house of Hinton Pipard. It was built by the Aldworth family, who lived there before becoming Barons Braybrooke and moving to Billingbear House. They fought for Charles I during the English Civil War and, in 1646, Richard Aldworth founded Reading Blue Coat School.

References

External links
Stanlake Park website

Companies based in Berkshire
Country houses in Berkshire
Tourist attractions in Berkshire
Wineries of England